The Catalan News Agency (CNA, in Catalan: Agència Catalana de Notícies (ACN)) is a news agency owned by the Catalan government via the public corporation Intracatalònia, SA. It is one of the first digital news agencies created in Europe and has been operating since 1999. It is a pioneer in the use of Information technology, remote work and decentralised organisation applied to a virtual journalistic environment.

The CNA (headquartered in Barcelona) currently employs over 80 professionals and has branches in Berlin, Brussels, London, Madrid, New York City and Paris. Furthermore, it shares information with other state-owned agencies and is a member of ANSAmed, the group of Mediterranean agencies.

References

External links
 Agència Catalana de Notícies 
 Catalan News Agency

Government of Catalonia
1999 establishments in Catalonia
Mass media in Catalonia
Companies based in Barcelona
News agencies based in Spain
Corporació Catalana de Mitjans Audiovisuals
Government-owned companies of Spain